Thakurli is a railway station on the Central line of the Mumbai Suburban Railway network, serving the city of Thakurli. Thakurli is at a distance of 49 km from the Mumbai CST station.

References 

Mumbai Suburban Railway stations
Mumbai CR railway division
Railway stations in Thane district
Transport in Kalyan-Dombivli